The Equestrian Portrait of Prince Balthasar Charles is a portrait of Balthasar Charles, Prince of Asturias on horseback, painted in 1634–35 by Diego Velázquez. It is now in the Prado.

Velázquez was commissioned to paint a series of equestrian portraits for the Hall of Realms, originally a wing of the Buen Retiro Palace in Madrid. This work was meant to fill the gap between two larger equestrian portraits of the prince's parents, Philip IV and Elisabeth of France.

Art historian Andrew Graham Dixon describes the subject as a "little boy on this plump horse, underneath a lowering sky full of dark clouds. The child looks lost." According to Simona Di Nepi, the young prince's calm demeanor while seated on a rearing horse has a political significance, representing him as a confident horseman and a strong leader. His authority is symbolized by the baton he holds, the sword he wears, and the military sash on his chest.

The peculiar thickness of the horse's abdomen may have been calculated by Velázquez to appear normal when the portrait was viewed from below, according to E. Lafuente Ferrari.

The Wallace Collection also has an equestrian portrait of the prince. This is attributed to the studio of Velázquez.

References

External links
Velázquez , exhibition catalog from The Metropolitan Museum of Art (fully available online as PDF), which contains material on this portrait (see index)

Balthasar
1635 paintings
Prince Balthasar Charles
Paintings of children